Seh Gor is a village in Kakavand-e Gharbi Rural District, Kakavand District, Delfan County, Lorestan Province, Iran. At the 2006 census, its population was 57, from 12 families.

References 

Towns and villages in Delfan County